Belfrage is a surname. Notable people with the surname include:

 Cedric Belfrage (1904–1990), British journalist, socialist, author and translator
 Bruce Belfrage (1900–1974), English actor and BBC newsreader
 Erik Belfrage (1946–2020), Swedish diplomat and banking executive
 Frank Belfrage (born 1942), Swedish ambassador, and Swedish Under Secretary for Foreign Affairs (2006–2014)
 Fredrik Belfrage (born 1949), Swedish TV and radio presenter
 Gustav Wilhelm Belfrage (1834–1882), American insect collector
 Henry Belfrage (1774–1835), Scottish theologian
 Nicolas Belfrage (born 1940), British Master of Wine and writer
 Sally Belfrage (1936–1994), American writer and journalist